Aleksei Valerievich Shaposhnikov (born 16 June 1973) is a Russian politician who has served as the chairman of the Moscow City Duma since 2014.

Biography 
Aleksei Valerievich Shaposhnikov was born on 16 June 1973 in Moscow. Father — Valery Shaposhnikov, Moscow City Duma Deputy 4-th and 5-th convocations.

Chairman of the Moscow City Duma 
During the elections to the Moscow city Duma 6-th convocation, held in September 2014, ran from Moscow branch of the party "United Russia", and this time won the election in his single-mandate constituency № 12. On September 24 the first meeting of the Duma 6-th convocation deputies adopted a resolution "On election of the Chairman of the Moscow city Duma", and A. V. Shaposhnikov was elected to this position (according to the regulations, he will lead the work of the Council during the whole validity term of its powers). In his speech after his election as the new speaker promised that the Moscow city Duma will be encouraged to debate different political forces, and representatives of all factions will be heard.

Controversy 
On 26 December 2018 deputy Elena Shuvalova during the meeting of the Moscow City Duma noticed that the voting system is registering the votes of the deputies incorrectly. Deputy Shuvalova noted that there were 36 votes registered in the system while she could only count 26 deputies on the floor. In reply to her request to count the deputies chairman Shaposhnikov noted that there is a "special system which counts the deputies on the floor" and "he fully trusts it". In response that it's working incorrectly, he noted that the system fully supports the legislative work of the Duma. The official video recording provided by the City Duma did not show the actual deputies on the floor.

Electoral history

References 

1973 births
Living people
Russian politicians
Politicians from Moscow
Deputies of Moscow City Duma
Kutafin Moscow State Law University alumni